Adani Transmission Ltd is an electric power transmission company headquartered in Ahmedabad. Currently, it is one of the largest private sector power transmission companies operating in India. As of July 2020, the company operates a cumulative network of 12,200 circuit kilometers, and more than 3,200 circuit kilometers are under various stages of construction.

History 

Adani Transmission was founded by Gautam Adani in December 2015 after separating the decade-old transmission business from Adani Enterprises. At the time of the founding, the company became the primary custodian for more than 3800 circuit kilometers of transmission lines originating from the Mundra Thermal Power Station, connecting Mundra–Dehgam, Mundra–Mohindergarh and Tirora–Warora.

Mergers and acquisitions 

In 2015, ATL acquired three wholly owned subsidiaries of PFC Consulting, which itself is a subsidiary of Power Finance Corporation – the Chhattisgarh-WR transmission line, Sipat transmission line connecting with Sipat Thermal Power Station and Raipur-Rajnandgaon-Warora transmission line.

In 2016, ATL further acquired the GMR Group’s transmission assets in the state of Rajasthan — the Maru Transmission Services Ltd (MTSL) and Aaravalli Transmission Services Ltd (ATSL). In the same year, the company also acquired Reliance Infrastructure's transmission assets of the Western Region System Strengthening Scheme (WRSSS).

In December 2017, the company obtained a share purchase agreement (SPA) for the acquisition of the Mumbai Generation Transmission & Distribution (GTD) business from Reliance Infrastructure. In March 2018, the shareholders of Reliance Infrastructure approved the sale of its power business for Rs. 18,800 crore to Adani Transmission Limited. This resulted in the founding of Adani Mumbai Electricity Limited, a 100% wholly owned subsidiary of ATL which currently serves more than 3 million consumers across a license area of approximately 400 square kilometers in the city of Mumbai.

In February 2019, ATL acquired KEC International's Bikaner-Sikar transmission asset in Rajasthan. In September of the same year, the company acquired PFC Consulting's Bikaner-Khetri transmission project in Rajasthan.

In July 2020, the company signed definitive agreements with Kalpataru Power Transmission (KPTL) for acquiring Alipurduar Transmission. adding 650 circuit kilometers in its network from the state of Bihar and West Bengal.

Controversies

Allegations of stock manipulation 
In January 2023, Hindenburg Research published the findings of a two-year investigation claiming that Adani had engaged in market manipulation and accounting malpractices; Hindenburg also disclosed that it was holding short positions on Adani Group companies. Bonds and shares of companies associated with Adani experienced a decline in value after the accusations. Adani denied the fraud allegations as unfounded and ill intentioned.

References

External links 
 

Converter stations
Electric power transmission infrastructure in India
Companies based in Ahmedabad
Electric power transmission system operators in India
Adani Group
Utilities of India
2015 establishments in Gujarat
Indian companies established in 2015
Energy companies established in 2015
Companies listed on the National Stock Exchange of India
Companies listed on the Bombay Stock Exchange